Piero Martín Hincapié Reyna (born 9 January 2002) is an Ecuadorian professional footballer who plays as a centre-back for Bundesliga club Bayer Leverkusen and the Ecuador national team.

Club career
Hincapié began playing football at the age of seven, initially for local clubs Escuela Refinería, Emelec and Barcelona. Aged ten, the defender moved to Guayaquil with Norte América. After a spell with Deportivo Azogues, he joined Independiente del Valle in November 2016. Hincapié was promoted into their first-team in August 2019 for a Serie A match with Mushuc Runa. He was selected to start and played the full duration of a narrow home defeat. In the subsequent 2020 campaign, shortly after winning the U-20 Copa Libertadores, Hincapié made appearances off the bench against Universidad Católica and Macará.

On 20 August 2020, Hincapié switched Ecuador for Argentina after agreeing a five-year contract with Primera División side Talleres; who paid $1,000,000 for 50% of his pass.

In August 2021, Hincapié signed for the German Bundesliga club Bayer Leverkusen. He made his debut on 16 August, coming into the Europa League group stage match against Ferencváros as Leverkusen won 2–1. He scored his first goal for the club on 30 September, scoring the opening goal against Celtic in a 4–0 victory in the Europa League.

International career
Hincapié appeared for the Ecuador U15s in 2017. In 2019, Hincapié represented his country as captain at U17 level. He played seven times at the South American U-17 Championship in Peru, before featuring four times at the subsequent FIFA U-17 World Cup in Brazil.

He made his debut for Ecuador senior national team on 13 June 2021 in a 2021 Copa América game against Colombia. He started and played a full match as Ecuador lost 1–0.

Career statistics

Club

International

Scores and results list Ecuador's goal tally first, score column indicates score after each Hincapié goal.

Honours
Independiente del Valle
U-20 Copa Libertadores: 2020

References

External links

2002 births
Living people
Sportspeople from Esmeraldas, Ecuador
Ecuadorian footballers
Ecuador youth international footballers
Ecuador international footballers
Association football defenders
Ecuadorian Serie A players
Argentine Primera División players
Bundesliga players
C.S.D. Independiente del Valle footballers
Talleres de Córdoba footballers
Bayer 04 Leverkusen players
2021 Copa América players
C.S. Norte América footballers
Ecuadorian expatriate footballers
Expatriate footballers in Argentina
Ecuadorian expatriate sportspeople in Argentina
Expatriate footballers in Germany
2022 FIFA World Cup players